This is a list of flags used in South Korea, from 1945 to the present.

National flags

National government flags

Military flags

Political flags

Flags of subdivisions

Provincial-level division flags

Flags of other cities

Historical flags

Historical flags of other cities

North Korean provincial flags

As the South Korean government claims the territory of North Korea as its own, provincial flags also exist for the North Korean provinces that are claimed by South Korea. The following are flags of the five Korean provinces located entirely north of the Military Demarcation Line as according to the South Korean government, as it formally claims to be the sole legitimate government of the entire Korean Peninsula.

See also
Flag of South Korea
List of Korean flags
Emblem of South Korea

References

Works cited

Korean, South
Flags
Flags
South Korea list